Hebballi  is a large village in the southern state of Karnataka, India. It is located in the Dharwad district of Dharwad taluk. Hence it is also the 2nd largest village of Dharwad District. after Saunshi

Demographics
As of the 2011 Census of India there were 2,502 households in Hebballi and a total population of 12,659 consisting of 6,456 males and 6,203 females. There were 1,497 children ages 0-6.

See also
 Dharwad
 Districts of Karnataka

References

External links
 http://Dharwad.nic.in/

Villages in Dharwad district